Joel Jay Kupperman (May 18, 1936 – April 8, 2020) was an American professor of philosophy at the University of Connecticut and author of Six Myths about the Good Life, a popular philosophical volume centering on those values most worth engaging in human life. He was best known to the general public as a young math expert on the radio and television show Quiz Kids. He astounded audiences with his ability to do complex mathematics rapidly and seemingly "in his head." He also had strong general knowledge, and was often the winner of the weekly  competitions featured on the show. The 1944 film Chip Off the Old Block, starring Donald O'Connor, Peggy Ryan and Ann Blyth, featured Kupperman as the "Quiz Kid", representative of the group.

During his initial Quiz Kids shows, Kupperman, who was then 7, lisped, which emphasized his youth and endeared him to the listening audience. In one episode of Quiz Kids, Joel showed his ability to multiply any number times 99 "in his head." When asked how he was able to do this he replied "It's a theequit twick." When asked what the "secret trick" was, he explained that he merely multiplied the number he was given by one hundred, then subtracted the original number from that total to get the correct answer.

He received his bachelor's and master's degrees at the University of Chicago, where he enrolled at age 16. Due to his fame as a Quiz Kids prodigy, he was bullied by other students. He developed an interest in Asian philosophy, through which he found a mentor: a visiting professor who advised him to leave the United States. He migrated to England, where he enrolled in the University of Cambridge, earning a Ph.D. in Philosophy. He started teaching at the University of Connecticut in 1960 and was made a full professor in 1972.

He was married to noted historian/author Karen Ordahl Kupperman, who teaches at New York University. The couple have two children: Michael Joel Kupperman, a noted cartoonist; and Charlie Anders Kupperman, a medical journalist and editor for Eli Healthcare. Kupperman was Jewish.

In 2018, Simon & Schuster published All the Answers, a graphic memoir by Michael Kupperman on his father Joel's rise to fame and his subsequent retreat from public life.

Kupperman died from complications of COVID-19 in Brooklyn, New York, on April 8, 2020. He was 83.

References 

1936 births
2020 deaths
American Jews
American philosophers
Jewish philosophers
University of Connecticut faculty
Deaths from the COVID-19 pandemic in New York (state)